There are at least 166 named lakes and reservoirs in Beaverhead County, Montana.

Lakes
 Ajax Lake, el. 
 Albino Lake, el. 
 Alpine Lake, el. 
 Anchor Lake, el. 
 Antelope Pond, el. 
 Baldy Lake, el. 
 Barb Lake, el. 
 Bear Lake, el. 
 Berry Lake, el. 
 Black Lion Lake, el. 
 Blair Lake, el. 
 Blanchard Pond, el. 
 Boatman Lake, el. 
 Bobcat Lakes, el. 
 Bobs Lake, el. 
 Cattle Gulch Lake, el. 
 Chain Lake, el. 
 Chan Lake, el. 
 Cherry Lake, el. 
 Conklin Lake, el. 
 Continental Lake (Montana), el. 
 Cooks Lake, el. 
 Cowbone Lake, el. 
 Coyote Lake, el. 
 Crescent Lake, el. 
 Crystal Lake, el. 
 Dad Creek Lake, el. 
 Darkhorse Lake, el. 
 Deadman Lake, el. 
 Deerhead Lake, el. 
 Dingley Lakes, el. 
 Dollar Lake, el. 
 Elbow Lake, el. 
 Elk Lake, el. 
 Elkhorn Lake, el. 
 Englejard Lake, el. 
 Ferguson Lake, el. 
 Fish Creek Lake, el. 
 Foolhen Lake, el. 
 Glacier Lake, el. 
 Goldstone Lake, el. 
 Gorge Lakes, el. 
 Grace Lake, el. 
 Granite Lake, el. 
 Grassy Lake, el. 
 Grayling Lake, el. 
 Green Lake, el. 
 Grouse Lakes, el. 
 Hall Lake, el. 
 Hamby Lake, el. 
 Harkness Lakes, el. 
 Harrison Lake, el. 
 Heart Lake, el. 
 Hidden Lake, el. 
 Highup Lake, el. 
 Hopkin Lake, el. 
 Horseshoe Lake, el. 
 Ice Pond, el. 
 Janhke Lake, el. 
 Johanna Lake, el. 
 Kelly Lake, el. 
 Lake Abundance, el. 
 Lake Agnes, el. 
 Lake Canyon Lake, el. 
 Lake Geneva, el. 
 Lake of the Woods, el. 
 Lena Lake, el. 
 Lillian Lake, el. 
 Lily Lake, el. 
 Lily Lake, el. 
 Lion Lake, el. 
 Lion Lake, el. 
 Lion Lake, el. 
 Little Lake, el. 
 Long Branch Lake, el. 
 Long Lake, el. 
 Lovell Lake, el. 
 Lovells Lake, el. 
 Lower Miner Lakes, el. 
 Lower Red Rock Lake, el. 
 MacDonald Pond, el. 
 Maurice Pond, el. 
 May Lake, el. 
 Minneopa Lake, el. 
 Morrison Lake, el. 
 Mosquito Lake, el. 
 Mud Lake, el. 
 Mud Lake, el. 
 Mud Lake, el. 
 Mulkey Lake, el. 
 Mussigbrod Lake, el. 
 Mystic Lake, el. 
 Nymphaea Lake, el. 
 Odell Lake, el. 
 Ovis Lake, el. 
 Pear Lake (Montana), el. 
 Peterson Lake, el. 
 Phlox Lake, el. 
 Pintler Lake, el. 
 Pioneer Lake, el. 
 Poison Lakes, el. 
 Polaris Lake, el. 
 Rainbow Lake, el. 
 Ridge Lake, el. 
 Rock Island Lakes, el. 
 Sand Lake, el. 
 Sawed Cabin Lake, el. 
 Sawtooth Lake, el. 
 Schulz Lakes, el. 
 Schwinegar Lake, el. 
 Scott Lake, el. 
 Selway Lake, el. 
 Shambow Pond, el. 
 Skinner Lake, el. 
 Skytop Lake, el. 
 Slag-a-melt Lakes, el. 
 Steer Lake, el. 
 Stewart Lake, el. 
 Stone Lakes, el. 
 Surprise Lake, el. 
 Swan Lake, el. 
 Swift Lake, el. 
 Tahepia Lake, el. 
 Teacup Lake, el. 
 Tendoy Lake, el. 
 Tent Lake, el. 
 Timberline Lake, el. 
 Torrey Lake, el. 
 Trapper Lake, el. 
 Trusty Lake, el. 
 Twin Lakes, el. 
 Twin Lakes, el. 
 Upper Miner Lakes, el. 
 Upper Red Rock Lake, el. 
 Van Houten Lake, el. 
 Vera Lake, el. 
 Violet Lake (Montana), el. 
 Waukena Lake, el. 
 Widgeon Pond, el.

Reservoirs
 Anchor Lake (Montana), el. 
 Blomquist Reservoir, el. 
 Bond Lake, el. 
 Boot Lake, el. 
 Brownes Lake, el. 
 Canyon Lake, el. 
 Clark Canyon Reservoir, el. 
 Deerhead Lake, el. 
 Dillon Reservoir, el. 
 Estler Lake, el. 
 Fish Reservoir, el. 
 Hirschy Reservoir, el. 
 Kelley Reservoir, el. 
 Kelly Reservoir, el. 
 Keystone Reservoir, el. 
 Lake Agnes, el. 
 Lima Reservoir, el. 
 Morgan Jones Lake, el. 
 Mussigbrod Lake, el. 
 Overnight Reservoir, el. 
 Pear Lake (Montana), el. 
 Reservoir Lake, el. 
 Reservoir Lake, el. 
 Schultz Reservoir, el. 
 Tub Lake, el. 
 Waukena Lake, el. 
 Widgeon Pond, el.

See also
 List of lakes in Montana

Notes

Bodies of water of Beaverhead County, Montana
Beaverhead